Truart Film Corporation was an American film production and distribution company active during the silent era. Actors Larry Semon and Elaine Hammerstein starred in a number of the company's productions.

Filmography

 Patsy (1921)
 The Prairie Mystery (1922)
 The Western Musketeer (1922)
 The Cub Reporter (1922)
 Women Men Marry (1922)
 The Drums of Jeopardy (1923)
 Riders of the Range (1923)
 The Unknown Purple (1923)
 The Empty Cradle (1923)
 Broadway Gold (1923)
 Let's Go (1923)
 In Fast Company (1924)
 Daring Love (1924)
 The Torrent (1924)
 On Time (1924)
 The Cowboy and the Flapper (1924)
 The Desert Sheik (1924)
  The Virgin (1924)
 Stepping Lively (1924)
 Laughing at Danger (1924)
 American Manners (1924)
 Youth and Adventure (1925)
 Brand of Cowardice (1925)
 The Mysterious Stranger (1925)
 The Thoroughbred (1925)
 Romance Road (1925)
 Where the Worst Begins (1925)
 Pals (1925)
 The Prince of Pep (1925)
 The Wild Girl (1925)
 The Fighting Cub (1925)
 The Reckless Sex (1925)
 The Silent Guardian (1925)
 Jimmie's Millions (1925)
 The Wall Street Whiz (1925)
 Tearing Through (1925)
 The Verdict (1925)
 The Fighting Demon (1925)
 The Sporting Chance (1925)
 Passionate Youth (1925)
 Three in Exile (1925)
 Dollar Down (1925)
 Soiled (1925)
 The Blue Streak (1926)
 The Hurricane (1926)
 The Merry Cavalier (1926)
 The Devil's Partner (1926)
 The Night Patrol (1926)
 The Broadway Gallant (1926)

References

Bibliography
 Slide, Anthony. The New Historical Dictionary of the American Film Industry. Routledge, 2014.

American film studios
Film production companies of the United States